Ashley Eckstein (born September 22, 1981) is an American actress and fashion designer. She is the founder of the fashion label Her Universe. She is best known for voicing the role of Ahsoka Tano throughout the Star Wars franchise, beginning with Star Wars: The Clone Wars in 2008.

Early life
Eckstein was born on September 22, 1981, in Louisville, Kentucky. She was raised in Orlando, Florida, where her first job was as a cast member at Disney-MGM Studios.

Career
Eckstein began as a child actress under her birth name, Ashley Drane. At age 12, she played disability advocate Helen Keller in a community-theater production of The Miracle Worker. Following more stage as well and television and TV-commercial work in Orlando, she moved to Los Angeles, where she played Lisa Rossbach, Admiral Chegwidden's goddaughter, on the military-justice drama series JAG. In 2002, she became the latest in a line of actresses to play Jan Brady, essaying the role in the TV-movie The Brady Bunch in the White House. She played the recurring role of Muffy on the Disney Channel sitcom That's So Raven. She also played small roles as Alicia in the film Sydney White and Ms. Cole in the film Alice Upside Down (both 2007).

Most prominently, she provides the voice of Ahsoka Tano on Star Wars: The Clone Wars, Star Wars Rebels, and Star Wars Forces of Destiny. Eckstein reprised her role as Ahsoka with a short voice cameo in Star Wars: The Rise of Skywalker.

In 2010, Eckstein started Her Universe, a fashion brand of science-fiction-themed clothing targeted at girls and women. In 2012, Disney began selling Her Universe products at Disneyland and Disney World.

Eckstein has joined UNICEF Kid Power, along with Aly Raisman and David Ortiz, as a brand ambassador Kid Power Champion.

She and E. K. Johnston co-wrote the short story "By Whatever Sun", which appeared in the 2017 Star Wars book From a Certain Point of View.

Personal life
She married former Major League Baseball player and 2006 World Series MVP David Eckstein on November 26, 2005, in his hometown of Sanford, Florida, followed by a reception at Walt Disney World.

Filmography

Film

Television

Video games

Audiobooks
 2016: E. K. Johnston: Star Wars: Ahsoka

References

External links

 
 

1981 births
Living people
Actresses from Louisville, Kentucky
Actresses from Orlando, Florida
American child actresses
American film actresses
American television actresses
American voice actresses
Dr. Phillips High School alumni
20th-century American actresses
21st-century American actresses